Harplands Hospital is a mental health facility in Stoke-on-Trent operated by the North Staffordshire Combined Healthcare NHS Trust.

History
The hospital replaced the existing Victorian mental health facilities in the area. It was designed by TPS Consult, built by Carillion under a PFI contract and was completed in 2001. The clinical commissioning for the hospital, which provides 150 beds, was carried out by United Medical Enterprises. The hospital provides treatment for a variety of mental health issues including bipolar disorder.

References

Hospitals in Staffordshire
Hospital buildings completed in 2001
NHS hospitals in England